Frederic Tamler Sommers (January 1, 1923 – October 2, 2014), better known as Fred Sommers, was an American philosopher who, after an initial focus on ontology generally, turned his attention specifically to a revival of classical logic. He is the father of the philosopher Tamler Sommers.

Birth and education
Sommers was born in New York City on January 1, 1923. His family was Jewish and he studied under Rabbi Joseph Soloveitchik in the 1950s. He received his BA and PhD in philosophy at Columbia University, his dissertation being entitled An Empiricist Ontology: A Study in the Metaphysics of Alfred North Whitehead.

Career
Sommers began his academic career at Columbia University, where he was assistant professor of philosophy from 1955 to 1963. He was invited to Brandeis University in 1964 as an associate professor of philosophy and was promoted to full professor in 1966.  From 1965 until his retirement, he held the Harry Austryn Wolfson Chair of Philosophy; from 1993 until his death he was Professor Emeritus of Philosophy at Brandeis. He died aged 91 in 2014.

Bibliography
An Empiricist Ontology. A Study in the Metaphysics of Alfred North Whitehead, Columbia University, 1955 (unpublished Ph.D. thesis)
The Logic of Natural Language, Oxford University Press, 1984. 
An Invitation to Formal Reasoning, with George Englebretsen and Harry A. Wolfson. Ashgate, 2000. 
Vice and Virtue in Everyday Life: Introductory Readings in Ethics, with Christina Hoff Sommers. Harcourt Brace, 1989. 9th edition:

Notes

References
Englebretsen, George. Three Logicians. Aristotle, Leibniz, Sommers, Van Gorcum Ltd, 1981. 
Englebretsen, George. The New Syllogistic, New York, Peter Lang, 1987. 
Englebretsen, George. Essays on the Philosophy of Fred Sommers: In Logical Terms, Edwin Mellen Pr, 1990. 
Oderberg, David S. The Old New Logic: Essays on the Philosophy of Fred Sommers, MIT Press 2005. 
Shook, John R., The Dictionary of Modern American Philosophers, Thoemmes,  2005.

External links
 Fred Sommers on the Logic of Natural Language
 Annotated Bibliography of Fred Sommers

1923 births
2014 deaths
American male non-fiction writers
American logicians
Jewish philosophers
Ontologists
20th-century American non-fiction writers
20th-century American philosophers
21st-century American philosophers
Rabbi Isaac Elchanan Theological Seminary semikhah recipients
Columbia University alumni
Columbia University faculty
Brandeis University faculty
Writers from New York City
Mathematicians from New York (state)
20th-century American male writers